José Durán (born Moca, Dominican Republic) is a Dominican fashion designer based in New York, New York.

References

Living people
Dominican Republic fashion designers
Dominican Republic emigrants to the United States
Year of birth missing (living people)